Nowlanville is a neighbourhood in the Canadian city of Miramichi, New Brunswick located mainly on Route 126.

History

Notable people

See also
List of neighbourhoods in Miramichi, New Brunswick

References

Border communities
 Barnaby River

Neighbourhoods in Miramichi, New Brunswick
Populated places disestablished in 1995
Former municipalities in New Brunswick